Azerbaijan Airlines Flight A-56 was a scheduled domestic passenger flight from Nakhchivan to Baku operated by Azerbaijan Airlines which crashed on 5 December 1995, killing 52 people. The aircraft servicing the flight, a Tupolev Tu-134B-3, experienced engine failure while climbing. The pilots performed a forced landing that required a sharp right turn to avoid an apartment block. The aircraft crashed in the south-western outskirts of Nakhchivan,  from the airport runway.

The crash became Azerbaijan Airlines' deadliest accident. The airline no longer operates the Tu-134.

Aircraft
The Tu-134B-3 involved in the accident, (c/n 63383), was manufactured on 28 August 1980 and was powered by two Soloviev D-30 turbofan engines. The aircraft had flown 27,500 hours of its 35,000 flight hour life before the crash, was last serviced on 25 July 1995, and an unspecified repair was carried out on 30 March 1993. The engines had operated roughly 16,000 hours out of their assigned 18,000 hour life and were last serviced on 27 November 1995. The no. 1 (left) engine had undergone eight unspecified repairs and the no. 2 (right) five unspecified repairs before the crash.

Crash
The aircraft took off from Nakhchivan at 17:52 local time. The co-pilot Sergey Kuliyev, who was at the controls, responded by countering the left bank, but five seconds later the flight engineer Alexander Sokolov reported, in error, that the no. 2 engine had failed. The captain Eduard Hasanov took over control of the aircraft. However, because the co-pilot had countered the left bank, the captain did not have the sensory information which could have alerted him that it was the no. 1 engine that had failed. The aircraft continued to climb. The captain then ordered the no. 2 engine to be shut down. The flight engineer retarded the right throttle and noticed that the power on the working engine was decreasing, he then pushed the no. 2 throttle back to full power, but the no. 2 engine had already stopped. Eight seconds later, the flight engineer reported that both engines had failed. The captain decided to make an emergency landing, but encountered an apartment block and made a sharp right turn to avoid it. Thirty people out of eighty-two on-board survived the accident (twenty-six passengers and four crew members).

Investigation
A joint investigation by the Russian Interstate Aviation Committee, aircraft manufacturer, engine manufacturer and Azerbaijani Ministry of National Security was launched. Azerbaijan Airlines believed defective spare parts caused the crash. The joint investigation commission found that vibration caused the nuts on the engine mounts to loosen and fall off. This caused the engine turbines to shift and become damaged, leading to the crash. Azerbaijan Airlines deputy head Nazim Javadov, however, said the use of the defective parts for repairs was permitted by the engine manufacturer, Russian company Perm Motors.

See also
 Kegworth air disaster – another accident involving the accidental shutdown of an operable engine following an engine failure event
 TransAsia Airways Flight 235
 SA Airlink Flight 8911

References

1995 in Azerbaijan
December 1995 events in Asia
Aviation accidents and incidents in 1995
Accidents and incidents involving the Tupolev Tu-134
Airliner accidents and incidents caused by engine failure
Aviation accidents and incidents in Azerbaijan
Airliner accidents and incidents caused by wrong engine shutdown
1995 disasters in Azerbaijan
History of Nakhchivan